Naomi Joy Riches MBE (born on 15 June 1983) is a British adaptive rower who won a bronze medal at the 2008 Summer Paralympics and a gold medal at the 2012 Summer Paralympics.

Personal life
Riches was born on 15 June 1983 in Hammersmith, London, England. She attended Cannon Lane school as a child. She is registered blind and is classified for competition in the B3 category. She competed for Harrow in the London Youth Games as a disability swimmer. At the age of 12 she was a National Disabled Swimming champion.

She attended the Royal National Institute for the Blind (RNIB) College in Worcester. She graduated from Buckinghamshire New University with a Bachelor of Arts degree in metalwork and jewellery design.

Riches currently works for a psychometric assessment provider as a sport and education consultant.

Rowing
Riches took up rowing whilst at the RNIB College in Worcester. She competes in the legs, trunks and arms adaptive mixed coxed four (LTAMix4+) event. She won gold medals in the event at the 2004, 2005 and 2006 World Rowing Championships and won silver in 2007.

She was selected to represent Great Britain at the 2008 Summer Paralympics held in Beijing, China, as rowing made its debut at the Games. Competing with Alastair McKean, Vicki Hansford, and James Morgan, along with cox Alan Sherman she won a bronze medal in the mixed coxed four.

Riches won a further world title in 2009, alongside Hansford, David Smith, James Roe and cox Rhiannon Jones. At the 2010 World Championships she won a silver medal competing with Smith, Roe, Ryan Chamberlain and Jones. He is visually impaired.

In 2011, she competed at the World Rowing Championships held at Lake Bled, Bled, Slovenia. She won the gold medal in the LTAMix4+ event alongside crewmates Pam Relph, David Smith, James Roe and Lily van den Broecke, the cox. They completed the one kilometre course in a time of three minutes, 27.10 seconds, finishing nearly five seconds ahead of the second placed Canadian boat. The result qualified a boat for Great Britain into the 2012 Summer Paralympics in London. The crew repeated their gold medal result at the Munich World Cup event in 2012.

Riches was selected along with Relph, Smith, Roe and van den Broeke, to represent Great Britain at the 2012 Summer Paralympics in the mixed coxed four event. The event took place between 31 August and 2 September at Eton Dorney, and the GB crew won the gold medal.

She was inducted into the London Youth Games Hall of Fame in 2012.

Riches was appointed Member of the Order of the British Empire (MBE) in the 2013 New Year Honours for services to rowing.

In 2016, she became the first woman to row the length of the River Thames. She completed this in less than 48 hours, as she had hoped (six seconds less exactly).

See also
 2012 Olympics gold post boxes in the United Kingdom

References

External links

 
 

1983 births
Living people
English female rowers
Members of the Order of the British Empire
People from Hammersmith
Paralympic rowers of Great Britain
Paralympic gold medalists for Great Britain
Paralympic bronze medalists for Great Britain
Rowers at the 2008 Summer Paralympics
Rowers at the 2012 Summer Paralympics
Alumni of the Royal National College for the Blind
Alumni of Buckinghamshire New University
Medalists at the 2008 Summer Paralympics
Medalists at the 2012 Summer Paralympics
World Rowing Championships medalists for Great Britain
Paralympic medalists in rowing